The France national under-18 rugby union team is the under-18 side of the France national rugby union team in the sport of rugby union.

History
Under-18 became a recognised age-grade in European rugby in 2004.

European Championship
The French Under-18 team has been competing in the European Under-18 Rugby Union Championship since 2004, when it was first held. In seven editions since, the team has won the final five times and played as the losing side in the other two, going out to England on both occasions.

The French side beat Ireland 27-3 in the 2010 edition of the tournament, marking its fifth title and its fourth in a row. France had a disappointing 2011 tournament, missing the final for the first time, failing to win a game and finishing only fourth.

Honours
 European Under-18 Rugby Union Championship
 Champions: 2004, 2007, 2008, 2009, 2010, 2015
 Runners-up: 2005, 2006, 2018

European championship

Results
France's recent results at the European Championship:

 French victories in bold.

Positions
The team's final positions in the European championship:

References

External links
  Official website of the Fédération Française de Rugby
 FIRA-AER official website

Under 18
European national under-18 rugby union teams